Murphy's Luck may refer to:
"Murphy's Luck", an episode from the television series Charmed
An alternate term for the phrase Murphy's Law